Sumgilbar Rural LLG is a local-level government (LLG) of Madang Province, Papua New Guinea.

Wards
01. Bunbun (Hember Avu and Brem language speakers)
02. Erenduk (Brem language speakers) 
03. Murukanam (Brem language speakers)
04. Malas (Manep and Waskia language speakers)
05. Imbab (Yamben language speakers)
06. Mirap (Gavak language speakers)
07. Karkum (Gavak language speakers)
08. Sarang (Takia language speakers) 
09. Basken (Gavak language speakers)
10. Budum (Garuz language speakers) 
11. Garup (Bargam language speakers) 
12. Megiar (Bargam language speakers) 
13. Biranis (Bargam language speakers) 
14. Liksal (Bargam language speakers) 
15. Barag / Aronis (Bargam language speakers) 
16. Bunu No.1 (Bargam language speakers) 
17. Kudas (Bargam language speakers) 
18. Wasab (Bargam language speakers)
19. Burbura (Garuz language speakers) 
20. Bagildik (Garuz language speakers) 
21. Deda
22. Bomasse
23. Bandimfok (Garuz language speakers) 
24. Asiwo (Garuz language speakers) 
25. Abab (Garuz language speakers) 
26. Dimert (Gavak language speakers) 
27. Bilakura (Gavak language/Garuz language speakers) 
28. Embor (Hember Avu language speakers)
29. Perene
30. Katekot
31. Hinihon

References

Local-level governments of Madang Province